Veleka Gray (born March 22, 1951), sometimes credited as Velekka Gray, is an American actress, best known for her roles as department store executive Vicki Paisley Cannell on Somerset, and as Mia Marriott on Love of Life from 1977 to 1980.

Life and career
Gray was born and raised in New Orleans, Louisiana.

In 1970, she landed her first soap role, replacing Donna Mills in the role of Laura Donnelly Elliott on Love is a Many Splendored Thing. In 1974 she was cast as vixen Susan Pritchett on How To Survive A Marriage.

In 1975 Gray joined the cast of Somerset as Victoria Paisley. Her screen partner in that role was Joel Crothers, who played Julian Cannell. Grey and Crothers were engaged to be married when he died in 1985.

In 1977, she was cast in the role of Mia Marriott on Love of Life.  In April 1980, she originated the role of nurse Lyla Montgomery on As the World Turns.

In 1983, Gray appeared on The Young and the Restless in February 1983 as sassy manicurist Ruby Collins. Two months later, in April, she began a contract role as a different character in the same series, Dr. Sharon Reaves, Patty Williams' demure and earnest psychiatrist.  This dual role made her the only actor in soap history to play two roles simultaneously on the same series that were neither related nor lookalikes.

Back in New York City in 1986, Gray became a regular cast member of the "CBS Radio Mystery Show" for Himan Brown.

Gray has taught acting, speech and business classes and worked with prisoners on public speaking skills.

Her recent work includes commercials and voice work.

Filmography

References

External links
 
 Personal Website

1951 births
Living people
American soap opera actresses
American film actresses
Actresses from New Orleans
21st-century American women